Sørfjorden is a fjord on the island of Stjernøya in Hasvik Municipality in Troms og Finnmark county, Norway. The fjord goes directly southeast to the Nerdalen valley at the end of the fjord. Sørfjorden is the westernmost of the fjords on Stjernøya. There are several isolated farms along the fjord. The fjord flows out into the Sørøysundet strait.

References

Fjords of Troms og Finnmark
Hasvik